The Sunspot Solar Observatory (SSO) is an astronomical observatory designed for the study of the Sun. The observatory is operated by New Mexico State University (NMSU) and the National Solar Observatory (NSO). It is split between operations at the telescope facility at Sunspot, New Mexico and data and management at the Department of Astronomy at New Mexico State University. Access to the facility telescopes and grounds are open for to the public for guided tours. It is funded by the National Science Foundation in partnership with the state of New Mexico.

General information 

The Sunspot telescope facility is located in Sunspot, New Mexico, and is part of the Lincoln National Forest on the western edge of the Sacramento Mountains. The ~ area is located on National Forest Service lands, managed by the U.S. Department of Agriculture, U.S. Forest Service (USFS), Lincoln National Forest, and the Sacramento Ranger District. Established by the U.S. Air Force (USAF) via a Memorandum of Agreement with the USFS in 1950, the facility was transferred to NSF in 1976. NSF and the USFS executed a land use agreement (1980) to formalize this transfer and the continued use of the land for the NSO. It was later known as the Sacramento Peak Observatory, and as one site of the National Solar Observatory (NSO). In 2018, all scientific research and public outreach at the telescope facility was taken over by the Sunspot Solar Observatory and AURA remain the operator of infrastructure on the site, including maintenance.

Sunspot Solar Observatory is a global consortium that currently consists of personnel both in Sunspot, NM, at New Mexico State University in Las Cruces, NM, and other institute across the world

Telescopes

The flagship telescope at the Sacramento Peak Observatory is the Richard B. Dunn Solar Telescope (DST), previously known as the Vacuum Tower Telescope.

In addition to the DST, Sunspot Solar Observatory hosts 4 other telescopes.

The John W. Evans Solar Facility (originally built 1952) hosted instruments for the High Altitude Observatory and the Air Force Research Lab and until 2009 obtained daily observations of million degree coronal emission that were used to predict the onset of the following solar cycle.

The other two Dome buildings (Hilltop Dome 1963, Grain Bin Dome 1950) are not used for research.

An Antarctic Mount telescope is situated beside the Visitor's Center on site and provides a light feed into the Visitor's Center. As the name suggests, this telescope was previously deployed in the Antarctic.

Visitor Center

The Sunspot Astronomy and Visitor Center provides an interactive astronomical experience through activities, displays, and informational exhibits. The Center is operated by New Mexico State University through support from the state of New Mexico and provides guided tours of the site and the telescope for the public on Saturday and Sunday. Self-guided tours are available during other times. The Visitor Center contains exhibits from the Dunn Solar Telescope, the Apache Point Observatory, and the Lincoln National Forest.

History
The origins of Sunspot as a Solar Observatory date back to the sudden increased interest of solar physics to the US military during the Second World War. In 1940, the High Altitude Observatory (HAO) was established in 1940 in Climax, Colorado, by Walter Orr Roberts and Donald Menzel. It was associated with both Harvard College Observatory and the University of Colorado and was incorporated in 1946. At the time it was the world's highest permanent observatory for astronomy, at an elevation of over 11,000 feet, and was designed purely for studying the Sun. Roberts worked with the Bureau of Standards, "forecasting radio conditions on the basis of solar observations". Such studies of the upper atmosphere were critical for predicting conditions for radio communication, guided missiles, and supersonic aircraft and, as a result, solar observations "became essential to the war effort". Suddenly the field of solar astronomy became an appealing goal for both astronomers and the military.

The Sacramento Peak Observatory was conceived as a complementary telescope to the existing facilities in Climax, as Roberts had realized that "there were long periods of cloudiness, especially during the winter, when it was not possible to make observations", and hence a second dedicated solar observatory should be established. The practical applications for solar research, as discovered by the military during World War II, regarding the impact solar activity had on radio communication spurred the US Congress to provide for a military-funded observatory. It became an important mission of the USAF to establish a solar observatory and "after the war, when the Air Force recognized the need to organize its own long-range program of solar studies, it quite naturally turned for specialized assistance to the recently formed High Altitude Observatory (HAO)". In September 1947, the USAF issued a contract to HAO and Harvard University to conduct a survey and thereby identify an appropriate site for a new solar observatory and to determine which instruments to install at the new site.

Any seasonal cloud cover at the new site needed to arrive in the opposite season to that at Climax, in order to then provide for year-round coverage of the Sun. Similar to Climax, the atmosphere above the new site should be exceptionally free from haze and dust in order to permit for the best possible observing. Roberts and Menzel examined the White Sands Proving Ground (an area used as a research rocket firing range near Holloman Air Force Base in Alamogordo, New Mexico). They "concluded that the section of the Sacramento Mountains in which Sacramento Peak is located would be especially promising for a solar research site. Further inquiries and inspection tended to confirm this initial reaction". Holloman Air Force Base could be used to supply the equipment and any supplies. Sacramento Peak was, at 9200 feet was also low enough to be more accessible to researchers than Climax at 11,000 feet and the thickly forested setting blocked interference from rising air currents up the mountain.

A small crew of 5 made the initial camp at the Sunspot site. This crew included Roberts, John "Jack" W. Evans (a student of Menzel's), and Rudy Cook (who had worked with Robert in Climax). Cook's companions soon returned home, leaving Cook and his dog Rocky to man the site. By the end of 1947, Menzel and Roberts made the recommendation that Sacramento Peak be chosen as the solar research site for USAF. By April 1948, the Committee on Geophysical Sciences (then within the War Department's Research and Development Board) formally accepted this recommendation and a contract was written, mandating the Air Force to complete the observatory. The specifics of the contract called for "the preparation of detailed plans for an integrated solar research facility, which would combine observational, analytical, and data-reduction activities, all on a larger scale than at any comparable observatory; design, development, and fabrication of the required optical device; and concurrently, theoretical studies of solar structure and characteristics"

Views from Sunspot
On the western side of the Sacramento peak, there are wide open views of Apache Point Observatory and Sloan Digital Sky Survey telescopes. From the overlook beside the telescope, White Sands National Park stands out as gypsum white  against the sandy background of the desert. On a clear day it is possible to see all the way south to the cities of El Paso, Texas, and Juarez, Mexico, and all the way north to the Trinity test site. The overlook can also be used for viewing rocket launches from White Sands Missile Range.

Gallery

See also

 List of astronomical observatories
 List of solar telescopes

References

External links

 Dunn Solar Telescope website
 USDA website
 NewMexico.org website

Solar telescopes
Solar observatories
Optical telescopes
Astronomical observatories in New Mexico
Buildings and structures in Otero County, New Mexico
1958 establishments in New Mexico